Physiological functional capacity (PFC) is the ability to perform the physical tasks of daily life and the ease with which these tasks can be performed. PFC declines at some point with advancing age even in healthy adults, resulting in a reduced capacity to perform certain physical tasks. This can eventually result in increased incidence of functional disability, increased use of health care services, loss of independence, and reduced quality of life.

See also 

Human body
Frailty syndrome
Frailty index
 Functional residual capacity, where it pertains to the lungs
Physiology

References

Ageing
Physiology